The following is a listing of commercially released books from Pinnacle Entertainment Group and licensees for the Savage Worlds role-playing and miniatures game. This does not include various free downloads. Accessories such as card decks, screens and miniatures are also not listed.

Great White Games/Pinnacle Entertainment Group

Core rules
 Savage Worlds: Fast! Furious! Fun! (SW) (1st Edition, 2003; hardcover. Revised Edition, 2004; hardcover)
 Savage Worlds: Explorer's Edition (SWEX)(1.5 Edition, 2007; digest-sized softcover)
 Savage Worlds: Deluxe Edition (SWD) (2nd Edition, 2011; hardcover)
 Savage Worlds: Deluxe Explorer's Edition (SWDEE) (2.1 Edition, 2012; digest-sized softcover)
 Savage Worlds: Adventure Edition (SWADE) (2.2 Edition, 2019; hardcover. 2.2 Edition {version 4.2}, 2019; PDF.)

Savage Settings series
 Evernight: The Darkest Setting of All (2003; hardcover)
 East Texas University / Degrees of Horror (2014; hardcover)
 50 Fathoms: High Adventure in a Drowned World (2003; hardcover)
 50 Fathoms Companion (2004; PDF)
 Necessary Evil: Supervillains Must Rise Where Heroes Fall (2004; hardcover)
 Low Life: The Rise of the Lowly (2005; hardcover)
 Rippers: Horror Roleplaying in the Victorian Age (2005; hardcover)
 Rippers Companion (2007; PDF)
 The Savage World of Solomon Kane (2007; hardcover)
 Solomon Kane: Travelers' Tales (2008; softcover)
 The Savage Foes of Solomon Kane (2010; hardcover)
 Slipstream (2008; hardcover)
 Necessary Evil: Explorer's Edition (2009; softcover)
 Solomon Kane Bennies (2009)
 Necessary Evil Bennies (2010)
 Slipstream Bennies (2010)
 Lankhmar: City of Thieves (2015: hardcover)
 Lankhmar: Savage Seas of Nehwon (2018: hardcover)
 The Savage World of Flash Gordon RPG (2018; Hardback)
 The Savage World of Flash Gordon: Kingdoms of Mongo (2018; Hardback)

Weird Wars
 Tour of Darkness (2004; hardcover)
 Necropolis 2350 (2006; softcover)
 Weird War Two (2009; hardcover)
 Weird War Two Bennies (2009)
 Weird Wars Rome (2013)
 Weird War One  (2016)

Deadlands
 Deadlands: Reloaded! (2006; hardcover)
 Deadlands: Coffin Rock (2008; softcover)
 Deadlands: The Flood, Plot Point Campaign (2009; PDF, hardcover)
 Deadlands: The Flood Player's Guide (2009; free PDF)
 Deadlands: Marshal's Screen / Murder on the Hellstromme Express adventure (2009; hardcover gamemaster's screen, softcover booklet)
 Deadlands: Don't Drink the Water (2009; PDF)
 Deadlands: Murder on the Hellstromme Express (2009; PDF)
 Deadlands Fate Chips (2009)
 Deadlands: Saddle Sore (2010; PDF)
 Deadlands Trail Guide: South o' the Border (2010; PDF)
 Deadlands Player's Guide (2010; 2nd Printing; hardcover)
 Deadlands Marshal's Handbook (2010; 2nd Printing; hardcover)
 Deadlands: For Whom the Whistle Blows–Night Train 2 (2010; PDF)
 Deadlands Trail Guide: The Great Northwest (2010; PDF)
 Deadlands: The 1880 Smith & Robards Catalog (2011; PDF/softcover)
 Deadlands Trail Guide: Weird White North (2011; PDF)
 Deadlands: Devil's Night (2011; free PDF)
 Deadlands Player's Guide (2012; 3rd Printing; softcover)
 Deadlands Marshal's Handbook (2012; 3rd Printing; softcover)
 Deadlands: The Last Sons, Plot Point Campaign (2012; PDF, hardcover)
 Deadlands: The Last Sons Player's Guide, (2012; free PDF)
 Deadlands: Guess Who's Coming to Donner (2012; PDF)
 Deadlands: Trail Guides, Volume I (2012; PDF/softcover)
 Deadlands: Return to Manitou Bluff (2012; PDF/softcover)
 Deadlands: Bad Times on the Goodnight (Blood Drive I) (2012; PDF)
 Deadlands: Temple of the Sun (Map Pack 1) (2012; PDF)
 Deadlands: High Plains Drovers (Blood Drive II) (2012; PDF)
 Deadlands: Ghost Towns (2012; PDF/softcover)
 Deadlands: Range War! (Blood Drive III) (2012; PDF)

Deadlands: Hell on Earth
 Deadlands: Hell on Earth Reloaded (2012; PDF, hardcover)

Deadlands Noir
 Tenement Men (Kickstarter Exclusive Dime Novel) (2012; PDF)

Standalone RPGs
 Pirates of the Spanish Main (2007; hardcover)
 Space 1889: Red Sands (2010; hardcover)
 The Sixth Gun Role-Playing Game (2015; hardcover & Paperback)

Skirmishes
 Rippers: The Horror Wars (2004; softcover)
 Modern Ops (2005; print-on-demand)

Genre toolkits
 Fantasy Bestiary Toolkit (2005)
 Fantasy Gear Toolkit (2005)
 Fantasy World Builder Toolkit (2005)
 Fantasy Character Generator Toolkit (2005)
 Science Fiction Bestiary Toolkit (2005)
 Science Fiction Gear Toolkit (2006)
 Science Fiction World Builder Toolkit (2006)
 Pulp Gear Toolkit (2006)
 Pulp GM's Toolkit (2006)
 Horror Bestiary Toolkit (2006)
 Horror Companion (2011)
 Horror GM's Toolkit (2007)
 Fantasy Companion (2009; softcover)
 Science Fiction Companion (2013)
 Super Powers Companion (2009; softcover)
 Super Powers Companion: Second Edition (2013)
 Horror Companion (2012; softcover)

Adventures
 Privateer's Bounty (2003)
 Screamers (2003)
 On the Rocks (2003)
 Rise Alabama (2004)
 Noble Deceit (2004)
 Zombie Run (2004)
 Highwater War (2004)
 Smugglers Cove (2004)
 Prisoner of Pain (2004)
 Through the Cathode Ray Tube (2005)
 The Black Ankh (2005)
 Tales from the Forlorn Hope (2006)
 The Third Hand (2006)
 The Templar Legacy (2008)
 Death on Dartmoor (2008)
 The Night of Thoth (2008)
 Heart of Steel (2009)
 Bayonets, Buttons, & Blood (2009)
 Weird Wars: Island of Dreams (2011)

Adamant Entertainment

Setting
 MARS (2009; PDF and softcover)
 Thrilling Tales (2009; PDF and softcover)

Atomic Overmind Press

Setting
 The Day after Ragnarok (2009; PDF and softcover)

Battlefield Press, Inc

Settings
 Sherwood: The Legend of Robin Hood (2009; PDF and softcover)
 Gaslight: Victorian Fantasy (2009; PDF and softcover)
 Eldritch Skies (2014; PDF and hardcover)
 Bloodshadows: Chronicles of Guf (2022; PDF and softcover)

Supplement
 Distant Vistas (2014; PDF and hardcover)
 Bloodshadows: Adversaries and Abominations (2022; PDF and softcover)

FunSizedGames

Setting
 Streets of Bedlam: A Savage World of Crime + Corruption (2012; PDF and softcover)

Adventure
 Streets of Bedlam: Five-Story Drop (2013; PDF and softcover)

Melior Via

Setting
 Accursed (2013; PDF and hardcover)

Supplement
 World of Morden (2016; softcover and hardcover)

Adventure
 Ill Omens (2014; softcover)

GG Studio

Settings
 Enascentia (2013; PDF and softcover)
 Freak Control (2014; PDF and softcover)
 Ultima Forsan (2014; PDF and softcover)
 Warage - L'Alba degli Eroi (2014; PDF and softcover)

Supplements
 Deadlands: Messico & Nuvole (2014; PDF and softcover)
 Enascentia - Dietro lo Schermo (2014; PDF and softcover)

Triple Ace Games

Settings
 Necropolis 2350 (2008; hardcover)
 Sundered Skies (2008; hardcover)
 Necropolis 2350: 2351-55 Update (2009; PDF and softcover)
 Hellfrost Player's Guide (2009; hardcover)
 Hellfrost Bestiary (2009; hardcover)
 Hellfrost Gazetteer (2009; hardcover)
 Sundered Skies Companion (2010; PDF and softcover)
 Hellfrost Encounters Book 1 (2010; PDF and hardcover)
 Hellfrost Expansion (2010; PDF and softcover)
 Wonderland No More (2011; softcover)

Genre toolkits
 Savage Worlds Handbook: Perilous Places & Serious Situations (2008; PDF)

Adventures

Daring Tales of Adventure
 #1: To End All Wars and Chaos on Crete (2008; PDF)
 #2: Web of the Spider Cult (2008; PDF)
 #3: Treasure of the Templars (2008; PDF)
 #4: The Talons of Lo-Peng (2008; PDF)
 #5: Sky Pirates of the Caribbean (2008; PDF)
 #6: The Palladium Peril (2008; PDF)
 #7: The Twelfth Gate (2008; PDF)
 #8: Terror of the Z-Bomb (2008; PDF)
 #9: Island of Terror (2009; PDF)
 #10: Kingdom of the Blood Gods (2009; PDF)
 #11: The Hands of Kali (2009; PDF)
 #12: Legacy of Tunguska (2009; PDF)
 #13: The Devil's Chalice (2009; PDF)
 #14: The Sword of Avalon (2009; PDF)
 #15: The Muramasa Curse (2009; PDF)
 #16: Empire of the Black Pharaoh (2009; PDF)
 Compendium #01 (2009; Softback)
 Compendium #02 (2009; Softback)
 Compendium #03 (2009; Softback)
 Compendium #04 (2010; Softback)
 Xmas DTA Special 2008: The Tale of the Fabulous Four (2008; PDF)
 Xmas DTA Special 2009: Rocket Nazis on the Orient Express (2009; PDF)

Daring Tales of Chivalry
 #1: A Knight's Tale (2008; PDF)
 #2: Death at the Joust (2008; PDF)
 #3: The Danbury Curse (2009; PDF)
 #4: Castle Fairstone & The Madness of Sir Stephen (2009; PDF)

Daring Tales of the Space Lanes
 #1: Waylaid on Wayland & Gunboat Diplomacy (2009; PDF)
 #2: Bad Debts (2009; PDF)
 #3: Robot Rumble (2009; PDF)
 #4: The Last Journey of The Exodus (2009; PDF)
 #5: The Black Guardian (2010; PDF)
 #6: The Stealer of Light (2010; PDF)
 #7: Deadly Chant (2010; PDF)

Hellfrost
 N1: Lair of the Vermin Lord (2009; PDF)
 N2: The Dark Seed (2009; PDF)
 N3: Shadow of Darkness (2009; PDF)
 N4: Pirates of the Crystalflow (2009; PDF)
 N5: The Eoster Festival (2010; PDF)
 S1: The Siege of Watchgap Fort (2009; PDF)
 S3: Descent Into Madness (2009; PDF)
 S2: The Lost City of Paraxus (2009; PDF)
 V1: The Heart of Winter (2009; PDF)
 V2: Against the Elements (2009; PDF)
 S4: The Ice Fiend and Other Tales (2010; PDF)
 V3: The Web of Deceit (2010; PDF)
 H1: Sins of the Father (2010; PDF)
 H2: The Blood of Godhammer (2010; PDF)
 L1: The Frost Giant's Hold (2010; PDF)
 S5: The Fey Tower and The Deadly Glade (2011; PDF)
 V4: Death in the Mire (2011; PDF)
 H3: The Blood Tide (2011; PDF)
 Compendium #1: Saga of the Frost Giants (2011; softcover)
 Compendium #2: Novice Adventures (2011; softcover)

Necropolis 2350
 Tales from the Frontline #01 (2008; PDF)
 The Long Sleep (2008; PDF)
 The Last Word (2008; PDF)
 The Broken Seal (2009; PDF)
 Tales from the Frontline #02 (2009; PDF)
 Opener of the Ways (2010; PDF)
 Echoes (2010; PDF)

Sundered Skies
 The Ice Tower (2008; PDF)
 Fate of the Summoner (2008; PDF)
 Blade of Destiny (2008; PDF)
 Mind Thief (2009; PDF)
 The Race (2009; PDF)
 Within the Skies (2010; PDF)
 Mists of Savannah (2010; PDF)

Wonderland No More
 Egg of Seven Parts (2008; PDF)

Supplements

Daring Tales of Adventure
 Daring Tales Guide to Rocket Rangers (2011; PDF)
 Daring Tales Guide to Elite Nazi Units (2011; PDF)

Daring Tales of the Space Lanes
 Sector 01 (2010; PDF)
 Combat Hazards (2010; PDF)

Hellfrost
 Hellfrost Calendar (2010; PDF)
 Region Guide #1: Sacred Places (2010; PDF)
 Region Guide #2: The Liche Lands (2010; PDF)
 Region Guide #3: The Magocracy (2010; PDF)
 Region Guide #4: Orcmark (2010; PDF)
 Region Guide #5: Vestmark (2010; PDF)
 Region Guide #6: The Withered Lands (2010; PDF)
 Region Guide #7: Shattered Moor (2010; PDF)
 Region Guide #8: The Ten Seas (2010; PDF)
 Region Guide #9: Drachenlands (2010; PDF)
 Region Guide #10: Heligioland (2010; PDF)
 Region Guide #11: Ertha's Realm (2010; PDF)
 Region Guide #12: Witchwood (2010; PDF)
 Region Guide #13: Royalmark (2010; PDF)
 Region Guide #14: Veermark (2010; PDF)
 Region Guide #15: Crystalflow Confederacy (2010; PDF)
 Region Guide #16: Alantaris Isle (2010; PDF)
 Region Guide #17: The Great Swamp (2010; PDF)
 Region Guide #18: The Freelands (2010; PDF)
 Region Guide #19: Unclaimed Lands (2010; PDF)
 Region Guide #20: The Mistlands (2010; PDF)
 Region Guide #21: Chalcis (2010; PDF)
 Region Guide #22: Midmark (2010; PDF)
 Region Guide #23: The Battlelands (2010; PDF)
 Region Guide #24: Aspiria (2010; PDF)
 Region Guide #25: Ostmark (2010; PDF)
 Region Guide #26: Nordmark (2010; PDF)
 Region Guide #27: Angmark (2010; PDF)
 Region Guide #28: Blackstone Barony (2010; PDF)
 Region Guide #29: Barony of Cul (2010; PDF)
 Region Guide #30: Barony of Trond (2010; PDF)
 Region Guide #31: Cairn Lands (2010; PDF)
 Region Guide #32: Coglelund (2010; PDF)
 Region Guide #33: Freetown (2010; PDF)
 Region Guide #34: The Frozen Forest (2010; PDF)
 Region Guide #35: Giant's Throne (2011; PDF)
 Region Guide #36: The Glittersands (2011; PDF)
 Region Guide #37: Heldalund (2011; PDF)
 Region Guide #38: Icedale Freeholds (2011; PDF)
 Region Guide #39: Lakeland (2011; PDF)
 Region Guide #40: The Vale (2011; PDF)
 Region Guide #41: Seithrby (2011; PDF)
 Region Guide #42: Sutmark (2011; PDF)
 Region Guide #43: Angarion (2011; PDF)
 Region Guide #44: The Borderlands (2011; PDF)
 Region Guide #45: The Abyss (2011; PDF)
 Region Guide #46: Godsheim (2011; PDF)
 Region Guide #47: Isles of the Seareavers (2011; PDF)
 Resource Management (2011; PDF)
 Heroes & Villains 1 (2011; PDF)
 Heroes & Villains 2: Spellcasters (2011; PDF)
 Creature Guide Bufomi (2011; PDF)
 Creature Guide Kreana (2011; PDF)

Daring Entertainment

Settings

Dawn of Legends
 Dawn of Legends (2009; PDF and softcover)
 Dawn of Legends Support Bundle (2009; PDF)

War of the Dead
 War of the Dead: Chapter One (2010; PDF and softcover)
 War of the Dead: Chapter Two (2011; PDF and softcover)
 War of the Dead: Chapter Three (2011; PDF and softcover)
 War of the Dead: Chapter Four (2012; PDF and softcover)

Super Powers Unleashed
 Super Powers Unleashed (2017; PDF and softcover)

Adventures
 G.E.T. Into Action: The Rising Storm (2009; PDF)
 War of the Dead: Dead of Night (2010; PDF)
 War of the Dead: Food For Thought (2010; PDF)
 War of the Dead: Outbreak at Hopewell (2010; PDF)
 Super Heroes Unleashed: Little Tin Gods (2017; PDF)

Supplements
 War of the Dead: The Paper Dead (Set 1) (2010; PDF)
 War of the Dead: Fan-Created Support (2010; PDF)
 War of the Dead: The Survivors (2010; PDF)
 War of the Dead: Values of Survival (2010; PDF)
 War of the Dead: The Survivors (Part 2) (2010; PDF)
 War of the Dead: The Digital Dead (2011; PDF)

Evil DM Productions

Source book
 Legends of Steel (2009; hardcover)

Gun Metal Games

Settings
 Interface Zero (2010; PDF and hardcover)
 Totems of the Dead: Player's Guide to the Untamed Lands (2011; PDF and hardcover)
 Totems of the Dead: Game Master's Guide (2011; PDF and hardcover)
 Interface Zero 2.0 (2014; PDF and hardcover)

Happy Monster Press

Settings

 Children of the Apocalypse (2018; PDF and print-on-demand)
 Legion of Liberty: Superheroes of 1776 (2019; PDF and print-on-demand)

Knight Errant Media

Settings

 Titan Effect: The Role-playing Game (2018; PDF and print-on-demand)
 Titan Effect RPG: Declassified Edition (2022; PDF and print-on-demand)

Legion Publishing

Adventures
 Savage Features #1: Out of Sight (2004)
 Savage Features #2: The Last Round (2005)
 Savage Features #3: They Came From Beyond Space (2005)
 World of Meridian #1 - The Hunt (2005)
 World of Meridian #2 - All that Glisters (2006)
 World of Meridian #3 - Neveredge Falls (2003/2006)

Deadlands adventures and source books
 Deadlands Dime Novel #1 - Beast of Fire (2005; print-on-demand)
 Deadlands Dime Novel #2 - Deadshot (2006; print-on-demand)
 Deadlands Dime Novel #3 - Frostbite (2006; print-on-demand)
 Deadlands Territory Guide - Newfoundland: Rock of Ages (2004)

Weird Wars adventures
 Weird War II Mission Manual #1 - Bridge Across Time (2004)
 Weird War II Mission Manual #2 - Ice Fang (2004)
 Weird War II Mission Manual #3 - Gods of Destruction (2005)
 Weird War II Mission Manual #4 - Demonic Artillery (2005)

Pirate Press

Setting
 The Battle for Oz (2014; PDF, hardcover, and softcover)

Reality Blurs

Setting
 Runepunk (2007; hardcover)
 Ravaged Earth: The World of High-Powered Pulp (2008; softcover, regular and deluxe (color) editions)
 Runepunk: Darksummer Nights (2009; softcover)
 Runepunk: Steam & Shadow (2009; PDF)
 Agents of Oblivion: Player's Guide (2009; PDF)
 Realms of Cthulhu (2009; hardcover)
 Iron Dynasty: Way of the Ronin (2010; softcover)
 Agents of Oblivion - The Perfect Cocktail of Horror and Espionage (2011; PDF and softcover)
 Ravaged Earth: Revised Second Edition (2013; PDF and softcover)
 Karthador: Swashbuckling Science Fiction (2013; softcover)

Adventures
 Agents of Oblivion: Starfall Jungle (2005, PDF)
 Iron Dynasty: Journey to Red Temple (2005, PDF)
 Relics & Rumors #1 (2009, PDF)
 Relics & Rumors #2 (2009, PDF)
 Amazing Exploits #1: Quest for the Lost Oasis (2009, PDF)
 Old School Fantasy #1: A Keg For Dragon (2010, PDF and softcover)
 Relics & Rumors #3 (2010, PDF)
 Relics & Rumors #4 (2010, PDF)
 Old School Fantasy #2: Darkness Over Keryhk Nhor (2010, PDF and softcover)
 Old School Fantasy #3: Hunger of the Iron Mage" (2010, PDF and softcover)
 Mythos Tales #1: Belly of the Beast (2011, PDF)
 Iron Dynasty: Kesshi Tales #1: The Wise Men & The Woods (2011, PDF)
 Iron Dynasty: Kesshi Tales #2: The Demon's Heart (2011, PDF)
 Iron Dynasty: Kesshi Tales #3: Fresh Blood (2011, PDF)
 Runepunk: Jobbers Tales #1: Whither Be Witherspoon? (2011, PDF)
 Old School Fantasy #4: Slave Pens of Moss Stone (2011, PDF)
 Old School Fantasy #5: Call of the Crow (2011, PDF)
 Old School Fantasy #6: Tangle in the Silver Vines (2011, PDF)
 Old School Fantasy #7: Rot & Ruin (2011, PDF)
 Old School Fantasy #8: Light & Dark (2011, PDF)
 Old School Fantasy #9: Hand of the Harbinger (2011, PDF)

Source books
 Powers & Perils: Orwell Industries (2006, softcover)
 Iron Dynasty Guidebook #1: Ikusa Kokoro (2011, PDF)
 Iron Dynasty Guidebook #2: Sorimizu (2011, PDF)
 Iron Dynasty Guidebook #3: Uma-Ko Ryoudo (2011, PDF)
 Runepunk Guidebook #1: GreyMesa (2011, PDF)

Ronin Arts
Source book
 Starships! (2005)

Savage Mojo
Settings
 Shaintar: Immortal Legends - Player's Guide (2005; softcover)
 Savage Suzerain (2009; hardcover)
 Savage Suzerain Player's Guide (2009; PDF)
 Suzerain - Dogs of Hades (2010; hardcover)
 Suzerain - Noir Knights (2010; hardcover)
 Suzerain - Shanghai Vampocalypse (2010; PDF)
 Suzerain - Caladon Falls (2010; PDF)

Silver Gryphon Games
 Wellstone City (2010; PDF)
 Wellstone City Chronicles - Two Bit Thugs (2010; PDF)
 Wellstone City Chronicles - Burning Crosses(2010; PDF)
 Wellstone City Chronicles - A Death Undeserving (2010; PDF)
 Camp Wicakini (2010; PDF)
 Wellstone City  (2010; softcover)
 The Pine Ridge Horror (2010; PDF)
 Zombacalypse (2010; PDF)
 Zombacalypse (2010; softcover)
 Wellstone City Chronicles - Schroedinger's Box (2011; PDF)
 Camp Wicakini - Part II (2011; PDF)
 Red Blizzard (2012; PDF)
 Wellstone City Chronicles - The Ranch Raid (2012; PDF)
 Wellstone City Chronicles - Two Bit Thugs (2012; PDF)
 Camp Wicakini 3: Wanagi Mato Lives! (2012; PDF)
 Wellstone City Chronicles - Breaking Murphy (2012; PDF)
 Wellstone City Chronicles - Wellstone City Encounter Deck (2011; PDF)

Sneak Attack Press
 Broken Earth (2014; PDF and hardcover)

12 to Midnight, Inc.
Adventures
 Last Rites of the Black Guard (2003)
 Weekend Warriors (2004)
 Bloodlines (2004)
 Innana's Kiss (2004)
 Brainwashed (2005)
 Skinwalker (2006)
 Jerry's Midnight Tales (2006)
 Fire in the Hole (2006)
 The Beast Within (2007)
 Chickens in the Mist (2007)

Source books
 Green's Guide to Ghosts (2005)
 Fear Effects (2005)

VampJac Productions
Setting
 Vampire Earth Sourcebook (2005; print-on-demand)

WorldWorks
Adventures
 Something Below (2007)
 Dinas Fford: The Seeds of War'' (2007)

References

Savage Worlds
Savage Worlds